Robert Dennis Fraser Bland (16 May 1911 – 10 April 1997) was an English first-class cricketer active 1929–34 who played for Nottinghamshire. He was born and died in Nottingham.

References

1911 births
1997 deaths
English cricketers
Nottinghamshire cricketers